The Mygale FR98 is an open-wheel formula race car chassis, designed, developed, and built by French manufacturer and race car constructor Mygale, for Formula Renault 2.0 Eurocup, in 1998.

References 

Open wheel racing cars
Formula Ford cars